Freilichtspiele Altusried is an open-air theatre in Altusried, Bavaria, Germany. Since its foundation in 1879, practically all actors and actresses are lay actors from the village Altusried. In 1999 a professional stage was built for the theatre with an audience capacity of 2500.

Theatres in Bavaria
Oberallgäu